The Matrimonial Causes Act 1937 is a law on divorce in the United Kingdom. It extended the grounds for divorce, which until then only included adultery, to include unlawful desertion for three years or more, cruelty, and incurable insanity, incest or sodomy.

Apart from the Roman Catholic Church, Church of England and its associated Mothers' Union, there was broad support for divorce law liberalisation, as this legislation had not been significantly amended since the passage of the Matrimonial Causes Act 1857, when adjudication had been removed from church courts and placed before secular courts.

Origins

Previously, before The Matrimonial Causes Act 1923, men could divorce women on the basis of adultery, but women were required to prove that their male partners had undertaken adultery and additional offences, such as incest, sodomy, cruelty (roughly equivalent to domestic violence) and other possible reasons.

In 1912, a Royal Commission had recommended further liberalisation, and the feminist-allied  National Union of Societies for Equal Citizenship promoted a more equitable treatment of divorce law which made it easier for women to seek divorce when it considered the matter in 1923. However, nothing was done at that time to broaden grounds for divorce from adultery alone, to include permanent desertion of one's partner and family, and incurable and severe mental illness.

A.P. Herbert
A.P. Herbert (1890–1971) had previously been a lawyer and non-fiction author who specialised in legal matters, before he focused his attention on the question of divorce law reform. His best-selling novel Holy Deadlock (1934) may have galvanised public opinion on the issue.  When a vacancy occurred in the House of Commons upon the resignation of the Conservative Sir Charles Oman, Herbert was elected as an Independent MP for the Oxford University constituency in November 1935.

1937
After two fruitless years in which Herbert's private member's bill languished in the ballot box, he sought the assistance of the Conservative Party MP for Evesham, Rupert de la Bère. His draft legislation had been scrupulously prepared and it met with considerable public support and few obstacles. On its second reading, the Matrimonial Causes Bill passed 78-12. Prime Minister Stanley Baldwin provided a day for the bill's third reading, which led to its successful passage (190-37).

The House of Lords proved compliant, and even liberalised the bill, shortening the time for desertion to two years, apart from instances of "hardship" and "depravity". However, it remained otherwise unchanged, with instant divorce for demonstrable adultery of either partner, as well for desertion after two years, or five years if the context was severe mental illness.

The law went into effect on 1 January 1938.

See also
Matrimonial Causes Act 1857

References

Sources
Geoffrey Best: "The Father of the Permissive Society" History Today: 59(6): June 2009: 40-42.
A.P Herbert: Holy Deadlock: London: Methuen: 1934.
A.P Herbert: The Ayes Have It : the story of the Marriage Bill: London: Methuen: 1937.
Lawrence Stone: Roads to Divorce: England 1530-1987: Oxford: Oxford University Press: 1990.

Divorce law in the United Kingdom
United Kingdom Acts of Parliament 1937